Brigadier-General John James Henry Nation, CVO, DSO (5 December 1874 – 5 November 1946) was a British Army officer who became a Conservative Party politician.

Career 
Nation was commissioned a second lieutenant in the Royal Engineers on 1 April 1895, and promoted to lieutenant on 1 April 1898. He served in the Second Boer War in South Africa from 1899 to 1902. He was first posted in the Orange Free State, including engagements at Vet River and Zand River; later in the Transvaal, where he was present at actions near Johannesburg and Pretoria, including the battles of Diamond Hill (June 1900) and Belfast (August 1900); and eventually in Cape Colony, south of the Orange River. Following the end of the war in June 1902, he left Cape Town for England on the SS Moravian in August 1902. He was stationed in Buncrana in 1903.

Nation served in the First World War and at the headquarter of Marshal Foch 1918–19. From 1927 to 1931 he was Military attaché Rome.
He was elected at the 1931 general election as Member of Parliament (MP) for Kingston upon Hull East, defeating the sitting Labour MP George Muff.  At the 1935 general election, Nation lost the seat to Muff, and never stood for election to the House of Commons again.

General Nation worked as a war correspondent with the BEF. In 1940 he became Zone Commander of the Home Guard (United Kingdom) until 1942.

Family 
He was married to Olive Elizabeth, widow of Capt Walter Rubens.

References

External links 

1874 births
1946 deaths
Conservative Party (UK) MPs for English constituencies
UK MPs 1931–1935
British Army generals of World War I
Royal Engineers officers
Companions of the Distinguished Service Order
Commanders of the Royal Victorian Order
British Home Guard officers
British Army personnel of the Second Boer War